Kai Wen "Kevin" Tan (born September 24, 1981) is an American artistic gymnast.

Early life
Tan was born in 1981 in Fremont, California. He graduated from Mission San Jose High School, Class of 2000.

Career
At Penn State, Tan was a six time All-American. He won the NCAA team championship as a senior in 2004 and also won the individual titles in still rings in 2003 and 2004, thus becoming Penn State's first back-to-back NCAA champion on the still rings. He also earned All-American honors on the parallel bars (2002) and high bar (2003) during his career.

Following his graduation, he began working as an assistant coach of the Penn State men's gymnastics team.

Tan was a member of the 2005, 2006, and 2007 U.S. teams to the World Gymnastics Championships and is a 3-time U.S. national champion on the still rings, his specialty.

Tan was named to the 2008 Olympic team and was selected as captain of the team. Tan did not qualify for the event final for his signature event the rings.  During the finals on the last event the pommel horse, Tan scored 12.755.  Fellow team member and original alternate Alexander Artemev secured the bronze medal with a score 15.350.

See also
List of Pennsylvania State University Olympians

References

External links
 
 
 
 
 

1981 births
Living people
American male artistic gymnasts
American sportspeople of Taiwanese descent
American people of Chinese descent
Gymnasts at the 2008 Summer Olympics
Olympic bronze medalists for the United States in gymnastics
Pennsylvania State University alumni
People from Fremont, California
Medalists at the 2008 Summer Olympics
Penn State Nittany Lions men's gymnasts
Penn State Nittany Lions men's gymnastics coaches